The 1980 WCT Tournament of Champions was a men's tennis tournament played on outdoor clay courts at the West Side Tennis Club in Forest Hills, Queens, New York City in the United States and part of the 1980 Grand Prix circuit. It was the fourth edition of the tournament and was held from May 5 through May 11, 1980. Third-seeded Vitas Gerulaitis won the singles title.

Finals

Singles
 Vitas Gerulaitis defeated  John McEnroe 2–6, 6–2, 6–0
 It was Gerulaitis' first singles title of the year and the 16th of his career.

Doubles
 Peter Fleming /  John McEnroe defeated  Peter McNamara/  Paul McNamee 6–2, 5–7, 6–2

References

External links
 ITF tournament edition details

1980 Grand Prix (tennis)
World Championship Tennis Tournament of Champions
WCT Tournament of Champions
WCT Tournament of Champions